Dorothy Dupre Kelly (February 12, 1894 - May 31, 1966) was an American motion picture actress of the early silent film era.

Personal life 
Dorothy Dupre Kelly was born in Philadelphia, Pennsylvania to Bessie Irene Kelly (née. Smith) and Thomas Kelly, descendants of Irish Quakers. She had a sister, Marguerite Kelly.

In August 1916, she married wealthy lumber dealer Harvey Hevenor. In 1922, she gave birth to twin daughters, Ann and Bessie, who later became a portrait painter. She died of a cerebral hemorrhage in Minneapolis, Minnesota in 1966.

Career 
After attending the National Academy of Design and earning a position in a publishing firm, Kelly decided to give up her career as an illustrator. Seeking more lucrative work, she decided to become a performer and, despite having no previous acting experience, applied for a position in the stock company at Vitagraph, signing a contract in the early teens. Her first film was a bit part in a 30-minute version of A Tale of Two Cities in 1911, which also featured future silent stars Norma Talmadge and Mabel Normand. She continued to make 70 films with Vitagraph and during these years she played opposite almost all of the Vitagraph comedians, including John Bunny and his successor Hughie Mack, as well as child star Bobby Connelly.

Like many stars of early film, Kelly's career dwindled with the popularity of two-reelers. She would leave film altogether after the filming of Vitagraph serial The Secret Kingdom in 1917.

Filmography

 The Awakening (1917) .... Marguerite
The Maelstrom (1917) .... Peggy Greye-Stratton... aka Millionaire Hallets' Adventure (USA)
 The Money Mill (1917) .... Helen Ogden
The Secret Kingdom (1916) .... Madame Savatz
The Scarlet Runner (1916) .... Miss Collingwood
The Law Decides (1916) .... Florence Wharton
Artie, the Millionaire Kid (1916) .... Annabelle Willowby
Salvation Joan (1916) .... Madeline Elliston
The Supreme Temptation (1916) .... Annette
From Out of the Big Snows (1915)
The Wheels of Justice (1915) .... Julia Dean
Four Grains of Rice (1915)
The Awakening (1915)
A Wireless Rescue (1915)
The Battle of Frenchman's Run (1915)
Twice Rescued (1915)
Mother's Roses (1915) .... Helen Morrison
In the Days of Fanny (1915)
My Lost One (1915)
Pawns of Mars (1915)
Forcing Dad's Consent (1914)
The Greater Love (1914)
Within an Ace (1914)
A Double Error (1914)
The Unwritten Play (1914)
The Wheat and the Tares (1914)
The Greater Motive (1914)
The Apple (1914)
The Toll (1914)
Two Stepchildren (1914)
The Crime of Cain (1914)
The Antique Engagement Ring (1914)
Sonny Jim at the North Pole (1914)
The Vanity Case (1914)
An Easter Lily (1914)
'Fraid Cat (1914)
The Drudge (1914)
The First Endorsement (1914)
Sonny Jim in Search of a Mother (1914)
The Flirt (1913)
The Tables Turned (1913)
The Glove (1913) .... The Wife
An Unwritten Chapter (1913)
The Snare of Fate (1913) .... Marion Marbury
An Infernal Tangle (1913)
A Modern Psyche (1913) .... June
Tricks of the Trade (1913)
Disciplining Daisy (1913) .... Daisy
Bunny Versus Cutey (1913)
Playing with Fire (1913) .... Marion Harrington
Bunny's Honeymoon (1913) .... Dorothy
O'Hara's Godchild (1913) .... Mrs. Tom O'Grady
The Weapon (1913)
The Skull (1913)
Ma's Apron Strings (1913) .... Molly Bush
My Lady of Idleness (1913)
All for a Girl (1912) .... Claire Taylor
O'Hara, Squatter and Philosopher (1912) .... Aileen Sullivan
The Model for St. John (1912)
Bettina's Substitute; or, There's No Fool Like an Old Fool (1912)
None But the Brave Deserve the Fair (1912)
The Counts (1912) .... Gladys
Popular Betty (1912) .... A Jealous Rival
The Lovesick Maidens of Cuddleton (1912) .... One of the Lovesick Maidens
Rip Van Winkle (1912/I) .... Steenie As An Adult
Suing Susan (1912) .... The Maid
Aunty's Romance (1912) .... A Stenographer
The Troublesome Step-Daughters (1912) .... A Step-Daughter
On the Pupil of His Eye (1912) .... The Senator's Ward
Pseudo Sultan (1912) .... A Dancer
A Tale of Two Cities (1911)

References

External links

 Photo at Silent Ladies
 Small Biography at Allmovie

1894 births
1966 deaths
American film actresses
American silent film actresses
Actresses from Philadelphia
20th-century American actresses
National Academy of Design alumni